Celebrity biographers are authors who specialize in writing sensationalized books about the lives of celebrities. Historically, biographers have been limited to those who specialized in literary works on important personalities or those officially commissioned by a living person or if deceased, by the estate to provide a biography of that person. In recent years, the term "celebrity biographer" has come into existence. ForeWord Magazine  notes that "There is the literary biographer and the celebrity biographer." Designed to be entertainment, books by celebrity biographers are often referred to as "quickie" biographies due to the limited amount of research done vis-à-vis that of a literary biographer. Books about celebrities have existed for many years but the advent of the personal computer (PC) reduced writing and editing costs substantially. Combined with the Internet, that provided massive sources and easy contact, the PC created an explosion of celebrity books beginning in the early 1990s. Because of these technological tools, early writers on celebrities such as Fred Lawrence Guiles who wrote Norma Jean; the life of Marilyn Monroe  in 1969 were able to substantially increase their book output while some newer celebrity biographers produce a book almost on an annual basis.

Celebrity biographies are published by small specialty publishers as well as major publishing houses, sometimes through an imprint. It can be a very profitable sideline and for some small publishing houses it is an important supplemental source of revenue that keeps them afloat in the highly competitive book market. This is the case for small presses such as ECW Press who advertise that they publish "biographies of today's best-known rock stars, writers, artists, and television personalities."

Legal actions
By the mid-1990s, fierce competition in the celebrity biography field developed that brought even more sensationalist claims. Statutes in the United States and other countries prohibit libel lawsuits for anything written or said about a deceased person and some celebrity biographers have taken advantage of this to make questionable assertions. In certain egregious cases, respected book reviewers such as Publishers Weekly have gone out of their way to caution readers by noting that the subjects are "conveniently for legal purposes, are deceased." a number of which led to lawsuits. However, for living people, the courts can and have become involved when the subject of a book believes their character has been deliberately harmed. Such was the case with the unauthorized biography Clint: The Life and Legend by Patrick McGilligan. First published in the UK and then in the United States in 2002 by St. Martin's Press. Eastwood filed a $10 million libel action in U.S. District Court in San Jose, California against the author and publisher, claiming the book was riddled with fabrications and insulting statements and that at least one of the author's primary sources was dubious at best. In response, McGilligan, who had written unauthorized biographies on film personalities James Cagney, Jack Nicholson, and Fritz Lang, told the Associated Press that "He (Eastwood) has sued people religiously" and "He's made a career of suppressing dissidence."  However, McGilligan and St. Martin's Press settled Eastwood's libel claim out of court and agreed to make changes to the book prescribed by Eastwood and agreed to remove certain claims in all future printings.

In other cases such as that of celebrity biographer Cliff Goodwin, his book titled "Catherine Zeta-Jones: The Biography" was canceled by Virgin Books just a few weeks before its December 2003 scheduled release. Goodwin had previously made unsubstantiated claims about Catherine Zeta-Jones and her legal counsel notified the author and publisher that legal action would be instituted if the book was published.

Some celebrity biographers 
Ellis Amburn
Christopher Andersen
David Bret
Suzanne Finstad
Albert Goldman
Boze Hadleigh
Laura Jackson
Kitty Kelley
James Robert Parish
Lawrence J. Quirk
Frank Sanello
William Schoell
Bob Spitz
Donald Spoto

See also 
Tabloid journalism

References

External links
 Clint Eastwood lawsuit
 The Publishing Law Center brief - "Publication of An Unauthorized Biography".
 BBC report on the Catherine Zeta-Jones canceled book
 see about eric mabius

 
Biographers by topic